Renzo Furlan was the defending champion, but did not participate.

Andre Agassi won the title, defeating Michael Chang 6–2, 1–6, 6–3 in the final.

Seeds

Draw

Finals

Top half

Bottom half

References
Main draw

1995 ATP Tour
SAP Open